This article covers the results and statistics of FC Thun during the 2011–12 season. During the season Thun will compete in the Swiss Super League, Swiss Cup and in the UEFA Europa League.

Match results

Legend

Swiss Super League

Swiss Cup

UEFA Europa League

Second qualifying round

Thun won 2–1 on aggregate

Third qualifying round

Thun win on away goals rule

Play-off round

Thun lost 5–1 on aggregate

Squad statistics
Appearances for competitive matches only

Transfers

In

Out

External links
 FC Thun official website
 FC Thun on soccerway.com

Thun season
FC Thun seasons
Thun